Yahagi No.2 Dam is a gravity dam located in Aichi Prefecture in Japan. The dam is used for power production. The catchment area of the dam is 514.2 km2. The dam impounds about 37  ha of land when full and can store 4354 thousand cubic meters of water. The construction of the dam was started on 1967 and completed in 1970.

See also
Yahagi Dam

References

Dams in Aichi Prefecture
1970 establishments in Japan